The 1995 Conference USA men's soccer tournament was the first edition of the Conference USA Men's Soccer Tournament. The tournament decided the Conference USA champion and guaranteed representative into the 1995 NCAA Division I Men's Soccer Championship. The tournament was hosted by Marquette University and the games were played at Valley Fields.

Bracket

Awards
Most Valuable Midfielder:
Jacob Thomas, Saint Louis
Most Valuable Forward:
Matt McKeon, Saint Louis
Most Valuable Defender:
Mike Franks, Charlotte
Most Valuable Goalkeeper:
Jon Busch, Charlotte

References

External links
 

Tournament
Conference USA Men's Soccer Tournament
Conference USA Men's Soccer Tournament
Conference USA Men's Soccer Tournament